The Husum Red Pied (German: Rotbuntes Husumer) is a rare breed of domestic pig with the nickname Danish Protest pig (German: Husumer Protestschwein and Danish: Husum protestsvin or danske protestsvin). It originates from North Frisia in Southern Schleswig in the beginning of the 20th century, when Danes living in the area under Prussian rule were prohibited from raising the Danish flag and displayed the Protest Pig instead. Due to its red color, its broad white vertical belt, and a trace of a white horizontal belt resembling the colors of the flag of Denmark, it was made a symbol of their cultural identity.

It was probably created out of Holsteinian and Jutlandian marsh pigs, the English Tamworth pig, and red variants of the Angeln Saddleback. It was recognized as a breed in 1954, but after a last birth in 1968, the breed was considered extinct.

Only in 1984 were pigs fully corresponding to the descriptions of the breed seen again. Associations of breeders continue to breed it and to register existing pigs of this breed. Breeding populations exist in the Berlin Zoological Garden, the Hanover Zoo, the Tierpark Arche Warder near Kiel, in the ZOOM Erlebniswelt Gelsenkirchen, in Dalmsdorf (Mecklenburg), Hof Lütjensee, and on the Archehof Blumencron. The Dortmund Zoo and the Tierpark Krüzen house small populations too. At the moment, around 140 specimens are alive worldwide. The German federal state of Schleswig-Holstein supports preservation of the breed for its cultural value.

References

External links
Homepage of the breeders association (German)
Portrait of the breed (German)
Hanover Zoo page on the Danish Protest Pig

Pig breeds originating in Germany
Animal breeds on the GEH Red List